Hofn Air Station (ADC/NATO ID: H-3) is a closed United States Air Force General Surveillance Radar station. It was closed on 30 June 1992.

History
Hofn Air Station was established as a North Atlantic Treaty Organization (NATO) radar station under Military Air Transport Service.  The 933d Aircraft Control and Warning Squadron was activated at the facility on 1 July 1951.   Initial radars at the station were an AN/FPS-3; AN/FPS-20A, and an AN/FPS-6 height finder.

The Greenland, Iceland and United Kingdom air defense sector, better known as the GIUK gap, was routinely utilized by the Soviet Union's long-range heavy bombers and maritime reconnaissance platforms as a transit point towards the Atlantic Ocean. From bases located at Archangel and Murmansk, Soviet aircraft would stream down to the North Cape in Norway towards the Gap which was use as a doorway to the vast Atlantic. Most of the Soviet missions were destined to probe United States’ air defense along the North Atlantic and after 1960 in the Caribbean where Cuba, the USSR's most important satellite state outside continental Europe, was located. Such was the perceived threat from the Soviet incursions that it became a priority for NATO to demonstrate to that the strategic Giuk passage would be monitored at all times.

The mission of the station was to intercept and shadow all Soviet aircraft in transit in and from the Gap which passed through the detection range of its radars and pass the information to interceptor aircraft deployed at Keflavik Airfield.

The 933d AC&W Squadron was inactivated on 30 June 1960, being replaced by the 667th Aircraft Control and Warning Squadron.  Beginning in 1984, information on aircraft detected by the station was relayed to the Keflavik NAS Radar Operations Control Center (ROCC), operated by the 932d Air Control Squadron.  In the 1980s, the radar as the station was upgraded to an AN/FPS-117v5.

Hofn Air Station was inactivated on 30 June 1992.  The radar was replaced by a civilian ARSR radar and is now used for air traffic control.

See also
 United States general surveillance radar stations

References

  A Handbook of Aerospace Defense Organization  1946–1980,  by Lloyd H. Cornett and Mildred W. Johnson, Office of History, Aerospace Defense Center, Peterson Air Force Base, Colorado
 Winkler, David F. (1997), Searching the skies: the legacy of the United States Cold War defense radar program. Prepared for United States Air Force Headquarters Air Combat Command.
 Information for Hofn AS, IS

External links
 Hofn Air Station

Radar stations of the United States Air Force in Iceland
Military installations closed in 1992